Pental may refer to:

 A quinary or base 5 number system
 Pental (company), an Australian manufacturer of cleaning products
 Deepak Pental (born 1951), academic and geneticist
 Pental Island, Victoria, Australia

See also
 Paintal, a surname
 Pentanal, an organic compound